The women's aerials at the 2007 Asian Winter Games was held on 31 January 2007 at Beida Lake Skiing Resort in Jilin, China.

Schedule
All times are China Standard Time (UTC+08:00)

Results

 Ünenbatyn Maral was awarded bronze because of no three-medal sweep per country rule.

References

Results

External links
Official website

Women's aerials